Diana Alina Lazăr (née Puiu; born 24 August 1991 in Drobeta-Turnu Severin) is a Romanian handballer who plays for CS Universitatea Cluj-Napoca.

Achievements
Liga Naţională:
Gold Medalist: 2014
Silver Medalist: 2013
Cupa României:
Winner: 2013, 2014
Supercupa României:
Winner: 2013

References

1991 births
Living people
People from Drobeta-Turnu Severin
Romanian female handball players
CS Minaur Baia Mare (women's handball) players